Foreknown was an American Christian metal band, where they primarily play a melodic metalcore and deathcore styles of music. They come from Duluth, Minnesota. The band started making music in 2000 and disbanded around 2005. The band released a studio album, Calm Seas Don't Make Sailors, in 2005, with Blood and Ink Records.

Background
Foreknown was a Christian metal band from Duluth, Minnesota. The band members were vocalist, Sam Dean, guitarist, Alan Isaacson and Seth Stepec, bassist, Noal "Dougie" Johnson, and drummer, Winter Montoya.

Music history
The band commenced as a musical entity in 2000. with their first release, Calm Seas Don't Make Sailors, a studio album, that was released on January 1, 2005, from Blood and Ink Records. The group disbanded in late 2005.

Members
Current members
 Sam Dean - vocals
 Alan Isaacson - guitar
 Seth Stepec - guitar
 Nolan "Dougie" Johnson - bass
 Winter Montoya - drums

Discography
Studio albums
 Calm Seas Don't Make Sailors (January 1, 2005, Blood and Ink)

References

External links
 Blood and Ink Records

Musical groups from California
2000 establishments in California
2005 disestablishments in California
Musical groups established in 2000
Musical groups disestablished in 2005
Blood and Ink Records artists